Agonopterix mutatella is a moth of the family Depressariidae. It is found on the Canary Islands.

References

External links
lepiforum.de

Moths described in 1989
Agonopterix
Moths of Africa